Barranca de los Laureles is a town near the Municipal Seat of Zacoalco de Torres in State of Jalisco, Mexico. The town also has a Plaza were the residents use it to celebrate parties. The streets of La Barranca de los Laureles are paved with rocks.

Fiesta de Marzo
According to the town residents, the town has an old celebration called "Fiesta de Marzo", which translates as "The March Party".  It is held every year starting on March 17, and ending on the 19th. In this party, the residents of La Barranca de Los Laureles celebrate the way of life, and a big Castillo is fired and "bandas" play folkloric tunes. There are also trampolines for the children. Food is a special part of the party and tacos, smoked corns, and drinks are served. Many people from nearby towns such as Barranca de Santa Clara and Barranca de Otates also come to join on the celebrations. Across the street from the Plaza is a small "cantina" which means "bar" in English where beer and tequila shots are sold. The cantina has two large pool tables and people who are ready to play for money. 

On a number of occasions, a town legend only known by the name of "Frank" shows up and brings gifts to children. There is not enough known who this "Frank" person is, but he lives in the town.  According to the town legend, "Frank" was at a cantina when four men tried to attack him. These men, at the time, were known for terrorizing the little town. When the four men attacked "Frank", he lost control and hit one of the men with a pool stick, punched the other in the face. The other two men were behind him and when "Frank" turned around he kicked one in the crouch while the other man ran away. The two remaining men in the bar were thrown in the middle of the Plaza and told to never return again. Still to this day, the four men never returned and the small town has since been quiet. Today, the Plaza is very beautiful and very peaceful.

External links
http://mexico.pueblosamerica.com/i/barranca-de-los-laureles-2/

Picture gallery

Populated places in Jalisco